Igor Yuryevich Martynov (born 22 June 1969) is a Ukrainian politician who served as the mayor of Donetsk from 13 October 2014 to 18 October 2016. He is currently an advisor to the Head of the Donetsk People's Republic since 16 May 2019.

References 

1969 births
Living people
Mayors of Donetsk
Pro-Russian people of the war in Donbas
Ukrainian collaborators with Russia